The Flemish bend, also known as a figure eight bend, a rewoven figure eight is a knot for joining two ropes of roughly similar size.

A loose figure-eight knot is tied in the end of one rope. The second rope is now threaded backwards parallel to the first rope. When properly dressed, the two strands do not cross each other.

Although fairly secure, it is susceptible to jamming. If tied, dressed and stressed properly it does not need "stopper" or "safety" knots.

See also

List of bend knots
List of knots

References

External links 
Flemish, or double figure eight, bend animated video by Marinews

Double knots

de:Doppelter Achtknoten